Arkhip Mikhailovich Lyul'ka (Russian: Архи́п Миха́йлович Лю́лька, Ukrainian: Архип Михайлович Люлька) (1908–1984) was a Soviet scientist and designer of jet engines, head of the OKB Lyulka, member of the USSR Academy of Sciences.

Biography 

Arkhip Lyul'ka was born on 23 March 1908, in Savarka village in the Kiev Governorate of Russian Empire (today Savarka, Kyiv Oblast, Ukraine). He was educated in the Savarka village school and graduated from the Kiev Polytechnic Institute in 1931 (Mikhail Kravchuk was his teacher and mentor in both institutions). He then worked for two years in the Kharkov turbogen factory.

Lyul'ka was a USSR aero-engine design bureau and manufacturer from 1938 to the 1990s when manufacturing and design elements were integrated as NPO Saturn based at Rybinsk. The Lyul'ka design bureau had its roots in the Kharkiv Aviation Institute (Ukrainian SSR)  where Arkhip M. Lyul'ka was working with a team designing the ATsN (Agregat Tsentralnovo Nadduva - Centralised supercharger) installation on the Petlyakov Pe-8 bomber. Lyul'ka was responsible for designing the first Soviet gas turbine engines, preferring to steer away from copying captured German equipment, he succeeded in producing home grown engines.

In 1939-1941 Arkhip Lyul'ka elaborated the design for the World's first turbofan engine, and acquired a patent for this new invention on 22 April 1941. Although several prototypes were built and ready for state tests, Lyulka was forced to abandon his research and evacuate to the Ural mountains as the Great Patriotic War began with the Nazi invasion of the Soviet Union.

In 1941-42, Lyul'ka worked in a tank factory in Chelyabinsk as a Diesel-engine engineer. However, after the failure of the Soviet rocket engine project of 1942, Joseph Stalin recalled Arkhip Lyul'ka among other scientists working on jet engines to resume their work in Moscow.

From 1945 onwards, the Soviet jet engine project split into two: the OKB MiG based their development on indigenous technology combined with German trophy aircraft and Western technology. Lyul'ka, however, refused any foreign influence and continued his own research. In 1945-47 he designed the first Soviet jet engine, TR-1, which passed the whole cycle of state tests with success. Pavel Sukhoy (head of the OKB Sukhoy) immediately proposed to install the new engine on his Su-11 jets, starting a long collaborative work with Lyulka. He later designed the AL-5, AL-7, AL-21 turbojet engines which were installed on the Su-7, Su-17, Su-20, Su-24, MiG-23 and other Soviet military aircraft. Lyulka also designed the upper stage engines for the Soviet moon rocket N1.

In the 1970s, Pavel Sukhoy asked Arkhip Lyul'ka to design a new engine with unorthodox characteristics for installation on the projected Su-27. The challenge was taken up, and although Pavel Sukhoy died in 1974, his work was carried on by his successors and colleagues, including Lyulka. The primary difficulty in designing this aircraft appeared to be in the engines, which had to be constantly redesigned and upgraded. As a result of the intensive work of Arkhip Lyul'ka and his team, the work on the new engine, AL-31F, was finally accomplished in the early 1980s. Arkhip Mikhailovich Lyul'ka died on 2 June 1984.

Achievements 

Overall, the achievements of Arkhip Lyulka have become decisive for Soviet Union and its allies. To this day, the patent for double jet turbofan engines widely used in all sectors of the world's aviation belongs to him. The AL-31 alone has become the cornerstone for various international developments in both civilian and military sectors, now undertaken by NPO Saturn, the heir to Lyulka's OKB.

Engines

Awards 
 Member of the USSR Academy of Sciences (since 1960)
 Hero of Socialist Labor (1957)
 Lenin Award (1976)
 Order of Lenin (on 3 occasions)
 Order of the October Revolution
 Order of the Red Banner of Labour (on 2 occasions)

See also 
 NPO Saturn
Kiev Polytechnic Institute 
Kharkiv Aviation Institute

References 

 History of Lyulka jet engines
 Lyulka AL engines
 Rubrikon encyclopedia 
 Biography
 Encyclopedia of aviation 
 Gunston, Bill. “The Osprey Encyclopaedia of Russian Aircraft 1875–1995”. London, Osprey. 1995.

External links
 http://www.ctrl-c.liu.se/misc/ram/

1908 births
1984 deaths
Soviet aerospace engineers
20th-century Ukrainian engineers
Soviet inventors
Full Members of the USSR Academy of Sciences
20th-century Ukrainian inventors
Jet engine pioneers
Baranov Central Institute of Aviation Motors employees